is a passenger railway station located in the city of Ōme, Tokyo, Japan, operated by the East Japan Railway Company (JR East).

Lines
Miyanohira Station is served by the Ōme Line, located 20.6 kilometers from the terminus of the line at Tachikawa Station.

Station layout
The station has one island platform serving two tracks. The station is unattended.

Platforms

History
The station opened on 1 April 1914. It was nationalized in 1944. It became part of the East Japan Railway Company (JR East) with the breakup of the Japanese National Railways in 1987. A new station building was completed in 2009.

Passenger statistics
In fiscal 2010, the station was used by an average of 504 passengers daily (boarding passengers only).

Surrounding area
 Tama River

See also
 List of railway stations in Japan

References

External links 

 JR East Station information (JR East) 

Railway stations in Tokyo
Ōme Line
Stations of East Japan Railway Company
Railway stations in Japan opened in 1914
Ōme, Tokyo